Leroy John Lins (June 21, 1913 – August 12, 1986) was an American professional basketball player. He played for the Akron Goodyear Wingfoots in the National Basketball League for eight games during the 1937–38 season and averaged 0.5 points per game. After basketball, Lins worked for Goodyear for many years.

References

1913 births
1986 deaths
Akron Goodyear Wingfoots players
American men's basketball players
United States Navy personnel of World War II
Basketball players from New Jersey
Guards (basketball)
New Brunswick High School alumni
Rutgers Preparatory School alumni
Rutgers Scarlet Knights men's basketball players
People from Milltown, New Jersey
Sportspeople from Middlesex County, New Jersey